Accent may refer to:

Speech and language
 Accent (sociolinguistics), way of pronunciation particular to a speaker or group of speakers
 Accent (phonetics), prominence given to a particular syllable in a word, or a word in a phrase
 Pitch accent, prominence signaled primarily by pitch
 Accent (poetry), placement of prominent syllables in scansion
 Diacritic, a mark added above, on top of, or below a letter
 Accent (fallacy), a logical fallacy related to reification

Music
 Accent (music), an emphasis placed on a note
 Accent (band), Belarusian heavy metal band
 The Accents, American doo-wop group
 Ecclesiastical accent, the simplest style of plainchant

Computers
 Accent (programming language), an interpreted programming language
 Accent kernel, an operating system kernel

Other uses
 Aeros Accent, a paraglider
 Hyundai Accent, car produced by Hyundai Motor Company
 Accent lighting, light focused on a particular area or object
 Accent Records, a record label
 ACCENT Speakers Bureau, a student-run organization at the University of Florida
 Ac'cent, brand name for monosodium glutamate (MSG)

See also
 
 
 Accenture, company
 Accentor, a bird species
 Accentor-class minesweeper, ship
 Ascent (disambiguation)